Duke of Schomberg in the Peerage of England was created in 1689. The title derives from the surname of its holder (originally Schönberg).

The Duke of Schomberg was part of King William of Orange's army and camped in the Holywood hills area of Craigantlet in Northern Ireland. The area is now a farm and the house that King William himself stayed in is now formally known as "Schomberg Cottage".

Dukes of Schomberg (1689)
Other titles: Marquess of Harwich, Earl of Brentford and Baron Teyes (1689)
Maréchal Frederick Schomberg, 1st Duke of Schomberg (1615–1690), military commander in the Williamite War in Ireland
Charles Schomberg, 2nd Duke of Schomberg (1645–1693), younger son of the 1st Duke, was also a general
Other titles (3rd Duke): Duke of Leinster, Earl of Bangor and Baron of Tara (En 1690)
Meinhardt Schomberg, 3rd Duke of Schomberg, 1st Duke of Leinster (1641–1719), elder son of the 1st Duke, was also a general. He died without surviving male issue and his titles all became extinct
Charles Schomberg, Marquess of Harwich (1683–1713), only son of the 3rd Duke, died from consumption before his father

Arms

References

Extinct dukedoms in the Peerage of England
1689 establishments in England
Noble titles created in 1689